Madeley Road railway station is a disused railway station in Staffordshire, England.

The Stoke to Market Drayton Line was opened by the North Staffordshire Railway (NSR) in 1870.  A station called simply Madeley was opened on the line in the same year.  Within a few months; possibly to avoid confusion with the LNWR station that was, at least, on the edge of Madeley; the station was renamed Madeley Manor after the nearby, abandoned house of that name.  By August 1871 the name had been changed yet again to Madeley Road.

The station had no goods facilities and due to its rural location passenger use was low and in 1931 the London, Midland and Scottish Railway closed the station.  An indication of how little usage the station received is shown by the LMS estimate that only £92 per year was saved by closure of the station.

The line through the station remained in use until the closure of Silverdale Colliery in 1998.

Present day

Madeley Road still has track in situ and is out of use.

References
Notes

Sources

Further reading

Disused railway stations in Staffordshire
Former North Staffordshire Railway stations
Railway stations in Great Britain closed in 1931
Railway stations in Great Britain opened in 1870